George Wells (2 November 1830 in Whitechapel, London –  23 January 1891) was an English cricketer. His son, Frederick, also played first-class cricket.

References
 George Wells player profile provided by cricinfo.com

English cricketers
1830 births
1891 deaths
Middlesex cricketers
Sussex cricketers
Marylebone Cricket Club cricketers
North v South cricketers
Married v Single cricketers